The 1987–88 UC Santa Barbara Gauchos men's basketball team represented the University of California, Santa Barbara during the 1987–88 college basketball season. They were led by head coach Jerry Pimm in his 5th season at UCSB. The Gauchos were members of the Pacific Coast Athletic Association and played their home games at the UC Santa Barbara Events Center, also known as The Thunderdome.

UCSB finished the season 22–8, 13–5 in PCAA play to finish second in the conference regular season standings. They received an at-large bid to the NCAA tournament – the school's first appearance in the “Big Dance.” As the No. 10 seed in the Southeast Region, they lost to No. 7 seed Maryland in the opening round.

Roster

Schedule and results

|-
!colspan=9 style=| Regular season

|-
!colspan=9 style=|Big West tournament

|-
!colspan=9 style=|NCAA tournament

Awards and honors
Brian Shaw – PCAA Player of the Year

1988 NBA draft

References

Uc Santa Barbara
Uc Santa Barbara
UC Santa Barbara Gauchos men's basketball seasons